The Hawaii Public Utilities Commission (HPUC) is a public utilities commission, a quasi-judicial tribunal, which regulates public service companies operating in the U.S. state of Hawaii.

In 2017 HPUC authorized smart inverters to increase grid stability.

References

External links
 Hawaii Public Utilities Commission Website

Hawaii
State agencies of Hawaii